Haageocereus fascicularis commonly known as 'Quisco de la precordillera de Arica' 
is a species of cactus  from the family Cactaceae. It is endemic to southern Peru and northern Chile.

It branches at the base. It reaches about 3 feet in height with many arms measuring about 2 to 3 inches in diameter.
Its white, very fragrant flowers open at night and measure about 3 inches. Its fruit is bright red.

References 
http://cactiguide.com/cactus/?genus=Haageocereus&species=fascicularis
http://www.cactuspro.com/encyclo/Haageocereus/fascicularis

The Cactus Family By Edward F. Anderson, Wilhelm Barthlott, Roger Brown

fascicularis
Cacti of South America
Flora of Chile
Flora of Peru